Canada–Jamaica relations are foreign relations between Canada and Jamaica.  Both countries established diplomatic relations in 1962.  Since March 4, 1963, Canada has a high commission in Kingston.  Jamaica has a high commission in Ottawa.

Both countries are full members of the Organization of American States and of the Commonwealth of Nations.

On April 20, 2009, Canadian Prime Minister Stephen Harper became the first Canadian head of government to address the Jamaican parliament.

There are 231,000 people of Jamaican descent living in Canada. Jamaican-Canadians celebrate their island heritage through festivals held in major cities across Canada, the most recognized of which is Caribana. Caribana is held in Toronto, Ontario every year and attracts over one million visitors to the region, many of whom fly all the way from Jamaica.

Canada also has an agreement with the Jamaican government to allow the Canadian Forces a staging area to move troops and supplies for humanitarian assistance and possible anti-terrorism operations.

See also 

 Jamaican Canadians
Black Jamaicans
Black Canadians
Hindu Jamaicans
Jamaican British

External links 
  Canadian Ministry of Foreign Affairs and International Trade about relations with Jamaica
  Canadian high commission in Kingston
  Jamaican high commission in Ottawa

References 

 
Jamaica
Bilateral relations of Jamaica